Michael James Matthews (born 26 September 1990) is an Australian professional road and track cyclist who currently rides for UCI WorldTeam .

Career

Early career

He was an Australian Institute of Sport scholarship holder, and in 2010 he became the Under 23 Road Race World Champion.

Matthews left  at the end of the 2012 season, and joined  on an initial two-year contract from the 2013 season.

Orica–GreenEDGE (2013–2016)

Matthews was selected to ride the 2014 Giro d'Italia. His  team won the opening team time trial in Belfast. On Stage 2, Matthews finished eighth behind Marcel Kittel in a sprint finish, also in Belfast, to take the pink jersey for the leader of the general classification from teammate Svein Tuft. Matthews won Stage 6, a hill top finish at Monte Cassino. Matthews withdrew from the Giro after Stage 10 after suffering a crash on Stage 9.

In 2015, Matthews won the points classification jersey of Paris–Nice as well as a stage. He finished in third place in Milan–San Remo. He also met success at the opening stage of the Tour of the Basque Country by outsprinting a group of about fifty riders after a hilly day. He then went on to a second place in the Brabantse Pijl, winning the sprint of the group after nearly getting to lone escapee Ben Hermans. At the Amstel Gold Race, Matthews grabbed another notable result, when he came in third of the final dash for the line while being part of a small leading group. At the Tour de Suisse, Matthews won stage 4 after following Peter Sagan's wheel in the sprint and passing him in the final metres. He was named in the start list for the Tour de France.

In the 2016 Tour de France, Matthews out-sprinted a breakaway group of 7 riders to win stage 10, his first stage win in the Tour de France, completing a set of Grand Tour stage victories.

In August 2016, it was confirmed that Matthews would join  for the 2017 season.

Team Sunweb (2017–2020)

Matthews was expected to contend for the points classification at the 2017 Tour de France, and his chances were boosted on Stage 4 after an incident during the final sprint which saw Mark Cavendish forced out of the race through injury and Peter Sagan, winner of the classification in the previous 5 Tours, disqualified. Matthews won Stage 14, a reduced peloton uphill sprint finish at Rodez. On Stage 16, the high pace set by Matthews'  dropped the green jersey wearer Kittel; Matthews, who was second to Kittel in points classification, won the stage. On Stage 17, Kittel crashed and withdrew from the Tour, putting Matthews in the green jersey. Matthews retained the jersey to Paris.

In 2018 he won the Grand Prix Cycliste de Québec ahead of Greg Van Avermaet and Jasper Stuyven, before adding the Grand Prix Cycliste de Montréal two days later, which he won ahead of Sonny Colbrelli and Van Avermaet. As a result, he became the second rider to win both Laurentian classic races in the same year, after compatriot Simon Gerrans in 2014. In 2019, he won two stages at the Volta a Catalunya, before repeating his victory in the Grand Prix Cycliste de Québec.

He finished 3rd in the 2020 Milan-San Remo and late in the year he took a top 10 in the UCI World Championships road race. A month earlier he won the 2020 Bretagne Classic Ouest–France, which was one of the few races that was run at its normal time during the COVID pandemic.

Team BikeExchange

In 2021 he had some strong results but no major wins, including 4th at the Amstel Gold Race,
5th in Gent–Wevelgem and 6th in Milan–San Remo. He rode Le Tour, but did not win any stages. He finished 2nd in the points classification, the second highest finish of his career, losing to Mark Cavendish 337–291.

In 2022 he had top 10 finishes in Brabantse Pijl, the Amstel Gold Race and 2022 Milan-San Remo. He won the first stage at the Volta a Catalunya, his first victory with Team BikeExchange. This victory was overshadowed as it was the stage where one of his primary rivals, Sonny Colbrelli, had a near fatal heart attack after crossing the finish line. In June he won the black jersey during the COVID marred 2022 Tour de Suisse.  During the 2022 Tour de France he suffered two defeats in back to back stages; finishing 2nd to his friend Tadej Pogačar, and then the next day to rival Wout Van Aert. On stage 14 he got involved in a breakaway and survived to the final climb outlasting all of the breakaway riders except Alberto Bettiol. It looked as though he was about to be defeated again, when he appeared to suffer from cramps and Bettiol rode away from him on the final climb. Matthews was able to recover, catch and drop Bettiol, and solo to the line for his first Tour win this decade.

Personal life
In August 2015, he married his Slovak girlfriend Katarína Hajzer.

Career achievements

Major results

2008
 1st John Woodman Memorial
 Internazionale Bresciana
1st  Points classification
1st Prologue & Stage 3b (ITT)
 1st Stage 7 Tour of the Murray River
 2nd Overall GP Général Patton
1st Stage 2
 8th Road race, UCI Junior World Championships
2009
 Oceania Road Championships (November)
1st  Road race
1st  Under-23 road race
1st  Under-23 time trial
 2nd  Time trial, Oceania Under-23 Road Championships (February)
 National Under-23 Road Championships
2nd Road race
3rd Time trial
 2nd Gran Premio della Liberazione
 9th Overall Tour of Japan
2010
 1st  Road race, UCI Under-23 Road World Championships
 Tour de Langkawi
1st Stages 1 & 3
 1st Stage 1 (TTT) Thüringen Rundfahrt der U23
 2nd Trofeo Banca Popolare di Vicenza
 2nd Ronde van Vlaanderen Beloften
 2nd Gran Premio della Liberazione
 National Under-23 Road Championships
3rd Road race
3rd Time trial
 4th Overall Tour of Japan
1st Stage 1 (ITT)
 5th Overall Tour of Wellington
1st Stage 4
 7th Overall Ringerike GP
1st Stages 2 & 3
 8th Overall Tour de l'Avenir
2011
 1st Rund um Köln
 1st Stage 2 Jayco Bay Cycling Classic
 1st Stage 1 Vuelta a Murcia
 3rd Time trial, National Road Championships
 3rd Eschborn–Frankfurt City Loop
 4th Overall Tour Down Under
1st Stage 3
 5th Overall Delta Tour Zeeland
 6th Grote Prijs Jef Scherens
2012
 1st Clásica de Almería
 Tour of Utah
1st  Sprints classification
1st Stage 3
 9th Overall Tour Down Under
 10th Brabantse Pijl
2013
 Vuelta a España
1st Stages 5 & 21
Held  after Stages 6 & 7
 Tour of Utah
1st  Sprints classification
1st Stages 2 & 4
 National Road Championships
2nd Road race
3rd Time trial
 2nd Vuelta a La Rioja
2014
 1st Vuelta a La Rioja
 Giro d'Italia
1st Stages 1 (TTT) & 6
Held  after Stages 2–7
Held  after Stages 2–7
Held  after Stages 6 & 7
 Vuelta a España
1st Stage 3
Held  after Stages 3–5
Held  after Stage 4
 Tour of Slovenia
1st  Points classification
1st Stage 1 (ITT)
 1st Stage 3 Tour of the Basque Country
 2nd Brabantse Pijl
 6th Trofeo Ses Salines
 7th Trofeo Palma
2015
 Giro d'Italia
1st Stages 1 (TTT) & 3
Held  after Stages 2–3
Held  after Stages 1–3
 Paris–Nice
1st  Points classification
1st Stage 3
 Tour of Alberta
1st  Points classification
1st Stage 2
 1st Stage 1 Tour of the Basque Country
 1st Stage 4 Tour de Suisse
 2nd  Road race, UCI Road World Championships
 2nd Grand Prix Cycliste de Québec
 2nd Brabantse Pijl
 3rd Milan–San Remo
 3rd Amstel Gold Race
  Combativity award Stage 5 Tour de France
2016
 1st Vuelta a La Rioja
 1st Stage 10 Tour de France
 Paris–Nice
1st  Points classification
1st Prologue & Stage 2
 UCI Road World Championships
3rd  Team time trial
4th Road race
 3rd London–Surrey Classic
 4th Bretagne Classic
 4th Grand Prix Cycliste de Montréal
 5th Brabantse Pijl
 5th Amstel Gold Race
 5th Grand Prix Cycliste de Québec
2017
 UCI Road World Championships
1st  Team time trial
3rd  Road race
 Tour de France
1st  Points classification
1st Stages 14 & 16
 1st Stage 1 Tour of the Basque Country
 1st Stage 3 Tour de Suisse
 3rd Grand Prix Cycliste de Québec
 3rd London–Surrey Classic
 4th Liège–Bastogne–Liège
 5th Bretagne Classic
 8th Gent–Wevelgem
 8th Grand Prix Cycliste de Montréal
 9th UCI World Tour
 10th Amstel Gold Race
2018
 1st Grand Prix Cycliste de Québec
 1st Grand Prix Cycliste de Montréal
 1st Prologue Tour de Romandie
 2nd  Team time trial, UCI Road World Championships
 2nd Overall BinckBank Tour
1st Stage 7
 2nd Eschborn–Frankfurt
 4th Bretagne Classic
 5th La Flèche Wallonne
 7th UCI World Tour
 7th Milan–San Remo
2019
 1st Grand Prix Cycliste de Québec
 Volta a Catalunya
1st  Points classification
1st Stages 2 & 6
 4th Brabantse Pijl
 6th Tour of Flanders
 8th La Flèche Wallonne
2020
 1st Bretagne Classic
 3rd Milan–San Remo
 7th Road race, UCI Road World Championships
2021
 4th Amstel Gold Race
 5th Gent–Wevelgem
 6th Milan–San Remo
 6th Grand Prix of Aargau Canton
 9th Eschborn–Frankfurt
2022
 Tour de France
1st Stage 14
 Combativity award Stage 14
 1st Stage 1 Volta a Catalunya
 1st  Points classification, Tour de Suisse
 2nd Grand Prix Cycliste de Québec
 UCI Road World Championships
3rd  Road race
3rd  Team relay
 4th Milan–San Remo
 4th Trofeo Pollença - Port d'Andratx
 6th Trofeo Alcúdia – Port d'Alcúdia
 6th Trofeo Playa de Palma
 7th Amstel Gold Race
 7th Brabantse Pijl
2023
 1st  Sprints classification, Tour Down Under
 3rd Road race, National Road Championships
 4th Cadel Evans Great Ocean Road Race

Grand Tour record

Classics results timeline

Awards
2017 – Sir Hubert Opperman Trophy (Australian Cyclist of the Year), Men's Elite Road Cyclist of the Year and the People's Choice Award.
2017 – ACT Sport Male Athlete of the Year.

References

External links

 
 
 
 
 
 
 

1990 births
Living people
Australian male cyclists
Australian Institute of Sport cyclists
Australian Vuelta a España stage winners
Sportspeople from Canberra
Australian Giro d'Italia stage winners
2014 Vuelta a España stage winners
Tour de Suisse stage winners
Cyclists from the Australian Capital Territory
Australian Tour de France stage winners
ACT Academy of Sport alumni
Cyclists at the 2010 Commonwealth Games